Nursery may refer to:

Childcare
 Nursery (room), a room within the house designed for the care of a young child or children.
 Nursery school, a daycare facility for preschool-age children
 Prison nursery, for imprisoned mothers with their young children

Places
 Nursery, Texas, unincorporated community in Victoria County, Texas, United States
 Nursery, Karachi, a suburb of Karachi, Sindh, Pakistan
 Nursery Site, RI-273, historic site in Westerly, Rhode Island, United States
 Nursery, British Columbia, a populated community in British Columbia

Music
 Nursery Suite (1931), by Edward Elgar
 The Nursery (song cycle) (1870), by Modest Mussorgsky

Art 

 The Nursery (Christmas Stockings) (1936), painting by Stanley Spencer (76.5x91.8cm)

Plants and gardens
 Garden centre, independent, or lawn  and garden departments of hardware and home improvement stores, often called "nurseries"  in the U.S.
 Plant nursery, a place where young plants or trees are raised

Science
 Stellar nursery, cosmic dust cloud in which stars form
 Nursery habitat, where juveniles of a marine species occur

Other uses
 Farm team, where sportspeople can gain experience before playing for a major team
 Nursery handicap, in British and Irish Horse racing, a flat handicap race limited to two-year-olds

See also
 Nurse (disambiguation)
 Nursery rhyme, Children Song.
 Nursery web spider, of the family Pisauridae